<noinclude>

HNK Orijent is a football club from Sušak, the eastern part of the city of Rijeka, Croatia. The club was established under the name Orient in 1919. They compete in the Croatian Second Football League. It is a phoenix club of NK Orijent which ceased activities in 2014 due to financial difficulties. The club is resurrected the same year under the new name, HNK Orijent 1919, but in September 2022 club assembly decided to bring back an old name, HNK Orijent.

History

Orient
The club was founded in 1919 in Sušak, eastern part of the present day city of Rijeka, under the name Jugoslavenski Športski Klub Orient. At the time, Sušak was predominantly Croatian, while Fiume, the western part of the city, was predominantly Italian. According to the legend, during his time on journey to the United States, one of the club's founders saw a ship named Orient in the New York Harbor. After he came back, he suggested the new club to be named Orient, a suggestion which was later accepted.  Although Orijent spent most of its history in lower tiers of Yugoslav and Croatian football, it was and still is popular among Sušak's population.

The club's greatest success came in 1969 when they were the champions of Yugoslav Second League's Division West but were unable to win promotion through playoff. Orijent and city rivals Rijeka contested numerous derbies during the early 1970s. Other notable successes were quarter-finals of Yugoslav Cup in 1980–81 and 1982–83. Orijent played top tier football only once, during the season 1996–97 when they finished 14th and were relegated.

In June 2014, the club was liquidated due to its inability to service mounting debts. Shortly thereafter, the club was re-established and admitted to the fifth tier of the Croatian football league system for the start of the 2014–15 campaign. Over the following five seasons, they gained promotion on three occasions, reaching the Croatian Second Football League for the 2019–20 campaign.

Names
As regimes changed, Orijent was often forced to change its name. At various stages of its history the club was known as Jedinstvo, Primorac, Primorje and Budućnost. Finally, from 1953 onwards, the club carries the original name, Orijent in various forms (NK Orijent, HNK Orijent 1919, HNK Orijent).

In June 2014, the club was liquidated and shortly thereafter re-established under the new name, HNK Orijent 1919. In September 2022 club assembly decided to rename the club by leaving out 1919 as a year of its original formation, while the club emblem was decided to remain the same. The new name entered official HNS register on 6 October 2022.

Honours
Yugoslav Second League Winner (1):
1968–69 (West)
Croatian Republic Football League Winner (4):
1967–68 (West), 1983–84 (West), 1984–85 (West), 1985–86 (West)
Druga HNL Runner-up (2):
1993–94 (South), 1994–95 (West)
Prva B HNL Runner-up (1):
1995–96
First League of Primorje-Gorski Kotar County Winner (1):
2014–15
Yugoslav Cup Quarter-final (2):
1980–81, 1982–83
Croatian Football Cup Quarter-final (1):
1997–98

Current squad

Out on loan

Notable players

Notable managers

 Ivan "Ðalma" Marković (1962)
 Ivan "Ðalma" Marković (1968 – 69)
 Marcel Žigante (1973 – 74)
 Josip Skoblar (1979 – 81)
 Ivan "Ðalma" Marković (1982 – 84)
 Marijan Brnčić (1987 – 89)
 Miloš Hrstić (1988 – 89)
 Velimir Naumović (1989 – 91)
 Mladen Vranković (1991 – 92)
 Ivica Šangulin (1992 – 94)
 Predrag Stilinović (1995 – 96)
 Boris Tičić (July 1996 – March 97)
 Drago Mamić (July 1997 – March 97)
 Ilija Lončarević (March 1997 – June 97)
 Rodion Gačanin (1999 – 2000)
 Danilo Butorović (2014 – 2018)
 Fausto Budicin (2019 – 2020)

Seasons

References

External links
 
NK Orijent at Nogometni leksikon 

HNK Orijent
Football clubs in Rijeka
Football clubs in Croatia
Football clubs in Primorje-Gorski Kotar County
Defunct football clubs in Croatia
Sport in Rijeka
Association football clubs established in 1919
Football clubs in Yugoslavia
1919 establishments in Croatia